The Kampuchea Christian Council is a Christian ecumenical organization founded in Cambodia in 1998. It is a member of the World Council of Churches and the Christian Conference of Asia.

See also 
Christianity in Cambodia

External links 
Official website
World Council of Churches listing

Christian organizations established in 1998
Members of the World Council of Churches
Christian organizations based in Asia
National councils of churches
Christianity in Cambodia
Religious organisations based in Cambodia